Mums' Bad Punk Music is a single released by Sucioperro on 17 November 2008 through Maybe Records.

Overview
The release of the band's second album, Pain Agency, was thwarted by several delays which prompted the release of "Mums' Bad Punk Music". The single contains a set of the band's heavier songs and, at the time, it gave some indication of what to expect from the forthcoming second album. Around the time of the release the band embarked on a small tour, including dates in Aberdeen, Edinburgh, Glasgow and London. The title track received airplay from BBC Radio One DJ, Vic Galloway.

Track listing

Personnel

Vocals, guitars, drums, bass and percussion: JP Reid & Fergus Munro
Additional vocals: Michael Logg and Janine Fearn
Additional guitars: David Aird
Produced by Sucioperro
Track 1 mixed by Chris Sheldon
Artwork: Stuart Chown

2009 EPs